Shenk is a surname. Notable people with the surname include:

 Thomas Shenk, professor of Molecular Biology at Princeton University
 Henry Shenk, American football coach
 David Shenk, American writer, lecturer, and filmmaker

See also
Schenck
Schenk
Shank (disambiguation)